Vanessa Lynn Branch (born March 21, 1973) is an English-born American actress and model. She is best known in the United States as the Orbit Gum girl for its series of television commercials (her catchphrase is "Fabulous!").

Early life

Branch holds her dual citizenship in the United Kingdom and the United States. She also speaks fluent French and Mandarin Chinese.

After graduating from Mercersburg Academy, a boarding school located in Mercersburg, Pennsylvania, she graduated from Middlebury College in 1994 with a double major in French and Theatre.  Branch won the crown as Miss Vermont 1994 and competed in the Miss America 1995 pageant. After graduating college she modeled internationally, working for such magazines as Elle and Harpers Bazaar. She then moved to Los Angeles to pursue her dream of acting. She is best known for the long running Orbit gum campaign, where she played their quirky British spokesperson for 8 years and appeared in 45 Orbit ads, as well as her role in the first 3 Pirates of the Caribbean films. She has also played leading roles in numerous Chinese films in Mandarin Chinese.  She has one child, a boy named Jack, born October 11, 2016.

Filmography

References

External links
 

1973 births
Living people
20th-century American actresses
20th-century English people
20th-century English women
21st-century American actresses
21st-century English people
21st-century English women
Actresses from London
American film producers
American television actresses
American video game actresses
American women film producers
British emigrants to the United States
English film producers
English television actresses
English video game actresses
Middlebury College alumni
Miss America 1995 delegates
Beauty pageant contestants from Vermont